Gastón Fernando Pezzuti Carro (born 9 June 1976) is an Argentine former footballer who played as goalkeeper. He previously played in Argentina, Chile, Colombia and Spain.

Pezzuti was member of the Argentine squad that won the 1995 FIFA World Youth Championship in Qatar.

Club career
Pezzuti began his career at Argentine giant Racing Club; he was promoted to the first team in 1997, two years after winning the 1995 FIFA World Youth Championship held in Qatar. He made his competitive debut in the 1–1 draw against Ferro Carril Oeste. In 2002, he was loaned to Lanús, and then returned to Racing on June of the next year.

In 2005, Pezzuti was signed to Chilean Primera División side Deportes Concepción, this being his first transfer to a foreign club. He made his debut for the purples in a 2–0 away win over Coquimbo Unido in a league game. Pezzuti was the first-team goalkeeper of a good Concepción team that qualified to the quarter-finals of the championship.

After his spell in Chile, he returned to his country to play in the recently promoted team in the Argentine Primera División Instituto de Córdoba and then he joined Spanish club Real Oviedo, remaining in Europe a short time. Pezzuti returned to his country, to play for Atlético de Rafaela and Gimnasia y Esgrima de Jujuy.

Atlético Nacional
On 8 June 2009, Pezzuti joined Primera División de Colombia team Atlético Nacional, signing a one-year contract. One of the factors that helped in his transfer to the verdolaga club was the signing of his former coach of Lanús, Ramón Cabrero, who managed the player at that club in 2003 and requested Pezzuti as the club's first goalkeeper. He made his club debut on 10 July 2009 in a 1–1 draw with La Equidad.

Because his good performances for the club, Pezzuti was promoted to captain of the club for the 2010 season, that was disappointing for Atlético, failing to win the championship, one of the season's objectives. Pezzuti was supposed to leave the team, as his contract ended in 2011, but shortly after it was renewed for one more season.

In 2011, Pezzuti was established as figure and idol of the team, after saving three penalties during the 2011 Apertura final's penalty kicks against La Equidad, winning the championship.

Honours

Club
Racing Club
Primera División de Argentina: 1
 2001 Apertura

Atlético Nacional
Primera División de Colombia: 1
 2011 Apertura

International
Argentina U20
FIFA World Youth Championship: 1
 1995

References

External links

1976 births
Living people
Argentine footballers
Argentine expatriate footballers
Argentina youth international footballers
Argentina under-20 international footballers
Gimnasia y Esgrima de Jujuy footballers
Instituto footballers
Club Atlético Lanús footballers
Real Oviedo players
Racing Club de Avellaneda footballers
Atlético de Rafaela footballers
Atlético Nacional footballers
Rosario Central footballers
Argentine Primera División players
Chilean Primera División players
Categoría Primera A players
Deportes Concepción (Chile) footballers
Expatriate footballers in Chile
Expatriate footballers in Spain
Expatriate footballers in Colombia
Footballers from Buenos Aires
Association football goalkeepers